Lesbian, gay, bisexual, and transgender (LGBT) persons in  Tonga face legal challenges not experienced by non-LGBT residents. Homosexuality is illegal in Tonga, with a maximum penalty of 10 years imprisonment, but the law is not enforced.

Tongan society is very socially conservative and highly religious. The Tongan Government requires all religious references on broadcast media to conform to mainstream Christian beliefs. The mixture of conservative values and colonial-era laws has resulted in a climate of fear, discrimination and homophobia for LGBT people. Along with Kiribati, Tonga is the only Polynesian country that has not signed or expressed support for the 2011 "joint statement on ending acts of violence and related human rights violations based on sexual orientation and gender identity" at the United Nations, which condemns violence and discrimination against LGBT people.

Many gay and lesbian Tongans emigrate to Australia or New Zealand in order to live a more open life that they may not get to experience in their native land.

History
Tonga, much like the rest of Polynesia, used to be tolerant of same-sex relationships and transgender people before the arrival of Christianity. The arrival of the European missionaries in the late 18th century quickly changed societal acceptance, and the first anti-gay laws in Tonga were enacted. The missionaries converted the local population to Christianity.

Fakaleiti
The , similarly to the fa'afafine of Samoa and the māhū of Hawaii, are people who were born male but act, dress and behave as female. They have traditionally been accepted by Tongan society. However, in modern times, Tonga has a powerful religious community, and recently has seen a rise in fundamentalism and religious fanaticism. As such, the  tend to face regular discrimination and stigma, despite being an integral part of Tongan culture. Cross-dressing is illegal in Tonga under laws inherited by the former British Empire.

The  traditionally would play an important domestic role in Tonga communal life, and would often be called upon to aid the royal family.

Despite discrimination and harassment, the  community organises an annual transgender beauty pageant competition called the Miss Galaxy Pageant, which is sponsored by the Tonga Government and local businesses.

Legality of same-sex sexual activity
Male consensual same-sex sexual activity, as well as heterosexual sodomy, is illegal in Tonga under the Criminal Offences Act with a maximum penalty of 10 years imprisonment. The offenders may also be whipped as a punishment if convicted.

Section 136. Sodomy and bestiality. Whoever shall be convicted of the crime of sodomy with another person ... shall be liable at the discretion of the Court to be imprisoned for any period not exceeding ten years....

Male rape is also illegal in Tonga:

Section 137. Assault with intent to commit sodomy. It is an offence for a person to assault another person with intent to commit sodomy.

Section 138. Indecent assault on man. It is an offence for a person to make an indecent assault on a man.

Section 139. Attempted sodomy, indecent assault upon a male. Whoever shall attempt to commit the said abominable crime of sodomy or shall be guilty of an assault with intent to commit the same or of any indecent assault upon any male person shall be liable at the direction of the Court to imprisonment for any term not exceeding 10 years.

Section 140. Evidence. On the trial of any person upon a charge of sodomy or carnal knowledge it shall not be necessary to prove the actual emission of seed but the offence shall be deemed complete on proof of penetration only.

Section 142. Whipping for certain offences. Whenever any male person shall be convicted of any offence against sections ... 136 and 139 of this Act the Court may, in its discretion in lieu of or in addition to any sentence of imprisonment authorised under this Act order the person so convicted to be whipped in accordance with the provisions of section 31 of this Act.

Decriminalisation efforts
In late 2016, the Tonga Leitis Association, an LGBT advocacy group, launched a national consultation with governments officials in order to decriminalise homosexuality and cross-dressing.

According to the Attorney General, there have, as of 2016, never been any sodomy convictions on consensual same-sex activity.

Recognition of same-sex relationships
Tonga does not recognize same-sex unions in any form.

Discrimination protections
Tongan law does not address discrimination on account of sexual orientation or gender identity in employment or the provision of goods and services.

The Judicial Code of Conduct 2010 states that "a judge shall be aware of, and understand, diversity in society and differences arising from various sources, including but not limited to race, colour, sex, religion, national origin, caste, disability, age, marital status, sexual orientation, social and economic status and other like causes ("irrelevant grounds")." The legislation prohibits judges from "manifest[ing] bias or prejudice towards any person or group on irrelevant grounds."

Living conditions
Tongan society is very socially conservative and highly religious. In addition, it has recently seen a rise in fundamentalism and religious fanaticism, which has been associated with an increase in hatred and discrimination towards LGBT people and fakaleitis.

Much like the rest of Polynesia, public displays of affection tend to be frowned upon, regardless of sexual orientation.

Activism
There is an LGBT association known as the Tonga Leitis Association, which is headed by Joey Mataele, an influential individual in Tongan society. In 2018, Cyclone Gita, which destroyed the Tonga parliament building, damaged the organisation's drop-in centre and shelter.

The 2012 Summer Olympics flag-bearer for Tonga was openly gay Amini Fonua. Fonua has become an advocate for LGBT rights, speaking with Tongan government officials about the need to reform Tonga's colonial-era laws that criminalise homosexuality.

In 2018, Frederica Tuita Filipe, daughter of Princess Royal Salote Mafileʻo Pilolevu Tuita, expressed her opposition to homophobia and discrimination.

Statistics
According to 2017 estimates from UNAIDS, there were about 400 transgender people in Tonga.

Summary table

See also 
 Human rights in Tonga
 LGBT rights in Oceania

References

Politics of Tonga
Human rights in Tonga
Society of Tonga
 
Tonga